Khirsadoh Junction is a small railway junction near Chhindwara city in Madhya Pradesh, India.

References
National Informatics Centre

Railway junction stations in Madhya Pradesh
Railway stations in Chhindwara district
Nagpur CR railway division